2,3-Epoxybutane is an organic compound with the formula CH3CH(O)CHCH3.  It is an epoxide.  The compound exists as three stereoisomers, a pair of enantiomers and the meso isomer.  All are colorless liquids.

Preparation and reactions
2,3-Epoxybutane is prepared from 2-butene via the chlorohydrin:
CH3CH=CHCH3  +  HOCl   →   CH3CH(OH)CH(Cl)CH3
CH3CH(OH)CH(Cl)CH3  →   CH3CH(O)CHCH3  +  HCl

A common reaction is its hydration to 2,3-butanediol.  Many such ring-opening reactions have been reported.

References

Epoxides